UnixWorld (Unixworld: McGraw-Hill's magazine of open systems computing.) is a defunct magazine about Unix systems, published from May 1984 until December 1995.

References

Defunct computer magazines published in the United States
Magazines established in 1984
Magazines disestablished in 1995
Magazines published in California
Unix history